Toledo, Ohio, held an election for mayor on November 2, 2021. The election was officially nonpartisan, with the top two candidates from the September 14 primary election advancing to the general election, regardless of party. Incumbent Democratic mayor Wade Kapszukiewicz successfully ran for reelection.

Primary election

Candidates

Declared
 Carty Finkbeiner (Independent), former mayor
 Wade Kapszukiewicz (Democratic), incumbent mayor
 Jan Scotland (Republican), businessman and former city councilor

Did not file
 Reginald Arrington Jr.
 Sharmayne Ivey
 Paul Manning

Declined
 George Sarantou, former city finance director and former city councilor (running for city council)

Endorsements

Results

General election

Results

References

Mayoral elections in Toledo, Ohio
Toledo
Toledo